Clark Henry Wells (September 22, 1822 – January 28, 1888) was a career officer in the United States Navy. He served in the American Civil War, as well as for two subsequent decades before retiring as a rear admiral.

Early life and career
Wells was born in Reading, Pennsylvania, and attended school there. He was appointed as a midshipman in the Navy on September 25, 1840, and spent a year at the Mediterranean Station before serving at the Home Station from 1842 to 1843. For the next two years, Wells served in the Pacific Squadron. He attended the Naval Academy in Annapolis, Maryland, in 1846 and graduated from its Naval School. He became a Passed Midshipman on July 11, 1846.

Wells was assigned to duty during the Mexican–American War blockading Vera Cruz. He sailed around the world from 1848 until 1851. Returning to the United States, he married Mary S. Walsh on September 11, 1851. Wells received a promotion to Master Commandant in 1855, then was commissioned lieutenant in September of that year.

Civil War
At the start of the American Civil War, Wells was suffering from exhaustion and exposure from this travels, coupled with depression from the recent death of his beloved brother-in-law, with whom he had sailed for twelve years. Consequently, he spent three months in the Pennsylvania Hospital for the Insane in Philadelphia where he was diagnosed as having Melancholia, being released on October 11, 1861, to return to active duty.

He was promoted to lieutenant-commander on July 16, 1862, then became the executive officer of the Philadelphia Navy Yard in early 1863. During this time he sent a letter to the United States Secretary of War, Edwin M. Stanton, that accused Maj. Granville O. Haller, former commander of George B. McClellan's headquarters guard, of sentiments disloyal to the Union. Haller spent years fighting the unwarranted charge, and was eventually reinstated.

He participated in the Battle of Mobile Bay under Admiral David G. Farragut. Later that year, he was transferred to the East Gulf Squadron and served the rest of the war under David Dixon Porter on the James River.

Post-bellum career
He was promoted to commander in 1866, and then to captain in 1871. He was Chief Signal Officer of the Navy in 1879–90. Wells received a promotion to commodore in 1880, and to rear admiral on August 1, 1884. He was placed on the retired list September 22, 1884.

Wells died in Washington, D.C., and was buried in Philadelphia's Laurel Hill Cemetery, Section M, Lot 22.

See also

References
The Records of Living Officers of the US Navy and Marine Corps, 1878
The Dismissal of Major Granville O. Haller of the Regular Army of the United States by Order of the Secretary of War in Special Orders, No. 331, of July 25, 1863
 Wells, Clark H., The Reply to a Pamphlet Recently Published by G. O. Haller, Late a U.S. Major U.S.A… (York, Pa.:  H. Young, 1865).

Notes

1822 births
1888 deaths
People from Reading, Pennsylvania
United States Navy officers
People of Pennsylvania in the American Civil War